Lisa Stewart is the only album by American country music artist Lisa Stewart. It was released in January 1993 via BNA Records. The album includes the singles "Somebody's in Love", "Under the Light of the Texaco" and "Drive Time".

Critical reception
Entertainment Weekly critic Alanna Nash gave the album a C− rating, referring to it as the "Crystal Gayle brand of gooey ear candy." Neil Pond of Country America magazine gave a favorable review, saying that the album's production recalled the Nashville sound of the 1960s, and that Stewart "is one talented singer who knows how to reconcile the anchor of tradition with the tide of progress."

Track listing
"Somebody's in Love" (Steve Bogard, Michael Clark) – 3:31
"Drive Time" (Annette Cotter, Kim Tribble) – 3:35
"Don't Touch Me" (Hank Cochran) – 3:02
"Under the Light of the Texaco" (Kye Fleming, Janis Ian) – 3:42
"Old-Fashioned Broken Heart" (Donny Kees, Terri Sharp) – 3:32
"If I Was Her" (Lisa Angelle) – 3:29
"Forgive and Forget" (Angelle, Reed Nielsen) – 3:11
"That Makes One of Us" (Rick Bowles, Barbara Wyrick) – 3:17
"There Goes the Neighborhood" (Ron Hellard, Tom Shapiro) – 2:51
"Is It Love" (Gidget Baird, Byron Gallimore, Don Prfimmer) – 3:28

"Is It Love" is omitted from the cassette version.

Personnel
As listed in liner notes.
Glen Duncan – fiddle
Jim Ferguson – background vocals
Sonny Garrish – pedal steel guitar
Steve Gibson – electric guitar
Sherri Huffman – background vocals
Mitch Humphries – keyboards
John Barlow Jarvis – keyboards
Jana King – background vocals
Mike Lawler – synthesizer
Paul Leim – drums, percussion
Craig Nelson – acoustic bass guitar
Brent Rowan – electric guitar
Lisa Silver – background vocals
Lisa Stewart – lead vocals
Diane Vanette – background vocals
Billy Joe Walker, Jr. – acoustic guitar
Bergen White – background vocals
Dennis Wilson – background vocals
Glenn Worf – bass guitar
Curtis Young – background vocals

Strings performed by the Nashville String Machine, conducted by Carl Gorodetzky and arranged by Charles Calello.

Singles

References

1993 debut albums
Lisa Stewart albums
BNA Records albums
Albums produced by Richard Landis